The Bilstein is a hill in the county of Schwalm-Eder-Kreis, Hesse, Germany. It lies within the Langenberge range.

Hills of Hesse